Deon Lotz (born 20 July 1964) is a South African film, television, and theatre actor. He is perhaps best known internationally for roles in Mandela: Long Walk to Freedom and Beauty (Skoonheid). He has appeared in both English- and Afrikaans-language productions.

Early life and career
Lotz was born 20 July 1964 in Cape Town. He sang for the Drakensberg Boys Choir in his teenage years. Lotz is the second youngest of four children, having an older brother and sister and a younger brother. Prior to becoming an actor, Lotz worked as a hotelier. Early in his career, Lotz acted in commercials. Today Lotz resides in Cape Town, working as a full-time actor in the Mother City, as well as travelling to Johannesburg for work. Lotz is known to have a son and a daughter.

Film career
In 2011, he had the starring role in Beauty (Skoonheid), directed by Oliver Hermanus, which became South Africa's submission for Best Foreign Language Film for the 2011 Academy Awards. Beauty won the Queer Palm Award at the 2011 Cannes Film Festival and was the first Afrikaans-language film to be screened at Cannes. Lotz received the Best Actor award at the 2011 Zurich Film Festival for his performance in the film. In 2012, Lotz also was named Best Actor in a Feature Film for his role in Beauty at the South African Film and Television Awards.

Lotz played the role of Kobie Coetzee in the 2013 feature Mandela: Long Walk to Freedom.

Lotz won Best Supporting Male at the 2013 kykNET Silwerskermfees (Silver Screen Festival) for his role in the Afrikaans-language family film, Faan se Trein. He was nominated for a 2015 SAFTA award for Best Supporting Actor for this film. Other notable films Lotz has appeared in include Musiek vir die Agtergrond (2013), Winnie Mandela (2013), "Master Harold" . . . and the Boys (2010), and Proteus (2003).

Television career
Lotz has starred in South African, European, and North American television productions, including The Book of Negroes (2015), Wallander (2015), When We Were Black (2014), and Flight of the Storks (2012). In 2016, Lotz received the SAFTA award for Best Supporting Actor - TV Drama for his role in When We Were Black.

Theatre career
Lotz has appeared in a number of South African theatre productions, including Liefde, Anna with noted South African actress Sandra Prinsloo; an Afrikaans-language version of Anton Chekhov's The Seagull; and Moeder Moed en Haar Kinders, a translation of Bertolt Brecht's Mother Courage. Lotz won Best Supporting Actor awards for Die Seemeeu and Moeder Moed en Haar Kinders at the 2015 Klein Karoo Nasionale Kunstefees. The actor was nominated in 2008 for Best Actor for his role in the play Wrestlers at the Fleur du Cap Theatre Awards.

Awards
 Nominee, Best Actor, Wrestlers, Fleur du Cap Theatre Awards, 2008
 Winner, Best Actor, Beauty, Zurich Film Festival, 2011
 Winner, Best Actor - Feature Film, Beauty, South African Film and Television Awards (SAFTA), 2012
 Winner, Best Supporting Actor, Faan se Trein, kykNET Silwerskeemfees, 2013
 Winner, Best Supporting Actor, Die Seemeeu, Klein Karoo Nasionale Kunstefees, 2015
 Winner, Best Supporting Actor, Moeder Moed en Haar Kinders, Klein Karoo Nasionale Kunstefees, 2015
 Nominee, Best Supporting Actor - Feature Film, Faan se Trein, South African Film and Television Awards (SAFTA), 2015
 Winner, Best Supporting Actor - TV Drama, When We Were Black, South African Film and Television Awards (SAFTA), 2016

Filmography

Feature films

Television

References

External links

See also

Living people
1964 births
South African male film actors
South African male television actors
Place of birth missing (living people)
21st-century South African male actors